Calvin Moreno Valies (born 22 January 1995) is a Dutch football player of Surinamese descent who plays as a defender for OFC Oostzaan.

Club career
He made his professional debut in the Eerste Divisie for SC Telstar on 11 August 2014 in a game against Jong Ajax.

Valies joined OFC Oostzaan in January 2019.

References

External links
 
 

1995 births
Living people
Dutch sportspeople of Surinamese descent
Dutch footballers
Footballers from Amsterdam
Association football defenders
A.V.V. Zeeburgia players
AFC Ajax players
ADO Den Haag players
Eerste Divisie players
SC Telstar players
Football League (Greece) players
Veria F.C. players
Liga II players
CS Luceafărul Oradea players
Syrianska FC players
Ettan Fotboll players
Dutch expatriate footballers
Dutch expatriate sportspeople in Greece
Expatriate footballers in Greece
Dutch expatriate sportspeople in Romania
Expatriate footballers in Romania
OFC Oostzaan players